Mario Diamond-Judah Douglas (born December 6, 1999) is an American rapper, singer-songwriter, and record producer. In 2017, Judah began producing music at age 17. Three years later, he released his first commercial single. He rose to prominence as an internet meme with his single "Die Very Rough” as well as for his sardonic criticism of American rapper Playboi Carti regarding the delayed release of his second studio album, Whole Lotta Red.

Early life
Mario Diamond-Judah Douglas was born on December 6, 1999, in Flint, Michigan but grew up in Atlanta, Georgia.

Career

2020: "Die Very Rough" and Whole Lotta Red
Judah uploaded his debut single "Crush" to SoundCloud on June 19, 2020. This was followed by the release of "Die Very Rough", which went viral on many different social media platforms in September. After the corresponding music video was released, it went viral on Twitter and several memes of the song were created comparing Judah's vocal style and lyrics similar to a Disney villain. In October, Judah performed at the Rolling Loud Festival 2020, which helped increase his audience. That same month, he released a cover of DaBaby and Roddy Ricch's Rockstar". On November 30, Judah flippantly announced on Instagram that he would be releasing American rapper Playboi Carti's second studio album Whole Lotta Red "himself" due to frustrations with the rapper not releasing it. He also announced the date of December 6, giving Carti one week to release it himself. Judah ended up making a EP with the title Whole Lotta Red, where he parodies the mumble rap sound and on December 6, Judah released "Bih Yah", the lead single from the project, to a positive reception from fans. The first half of Whole Lotta Red was released as an EP on December 11. Billboard and Google ranked the song "Die Very Rough" at number 75 on their list of the Top 100 Hummed Songs of 2020 in the United States. The song also reached the top of Spotify's Global Viral 50 chart dated October 15, 2020.

Artistry
Judah's music style has been described as a rap rock and horrorcore blend with unique vibrato vocals. According to Judah, he only recently discovered that he can sing, which led him to pursue rap for himself rather than producing for other artists. He has cited rock bands like Breaking Benjamin, Five Finger Death Punch, and Pantera as his musical influences. Notable fans of Judah are fellow rappers Trippie Redd and Lil Uzi Vert.

Discography

Extended plays

Singles

As lead artist

References

1999 births
Living people
21st-century African-American male singers
African-American male singer-songwriters
Trap metal musicians
Internet memes introduced in 2020
Musicians from Flint, Michigan
Record producers from Georgia (U.S. state)
Record producers from Michigan
Singer-songwriters from Michigan
Singer-songwriters from Georgia (U.S. state)
Rappers from Atlanta
Rappers from Michigan
Atlantic Records artists